Koidu Town (or Sefadu) is the capital and largest city of the diamond-rich Kono District in the Eastern Province of Sierra Leone. The population of Koidu Town is 124,662 based on the 2015 Sierra Leone national census. Koidu Town is the fifth largest city in Sierra Leone by population, after Freetown, Kenema, Bo and Makeni. Koidu Town is  a major urban, business, commercial and diamond trade center. Koidu Town lies approximately 280 miles east of Freetown, and about 60 miles north of Kenema.

Two of the world’s ten largest and most famous rough diamonds were found in the Woyie River that flows through Koidu Town.

The city is officially known as Koidu City. The mayor of Koidu City and members of the Koidu-New Sembehun city council are directly elected every four years by the residents of Koidu. The current mayor of Koidu Town is Komba Sam of the Coalition 4 Change  political party. Komba Sam was narrowly elected mayor of Koidu Town with 49.5% of the votes in the 2018 Koidu Mayoral election over his closest rival of the Sierra Leone People's Party . Politically, Kodu Town is not a stronghold of any political party, as the city is home to a significantly large support of both the Sierra Leone People's Party and the All People's Congress.

Koidu is one of the most ethnically and  religiously diverse cities in Sierra Leone. The city is inhabited by significant numbers of many of Sierra Leone's ethnic groups, with no single ethnic group forming a majority. The Krio language is by far the most widely spoken language in Koidu Town and is the primary language of communication in the city. Koidu Town is the hometown of Sierra Leone's vice president Mohamed Juldeh Jalloh, Sierra Leone"s First Lady Fatima Bio and former Sierra Leone"s vice president Samuel Sam-Sumana; as all three of them were born and raised in the city.

History 
 
In 1995 the government of Sierra Leone signed an agreement with the South African company Branch Energy Limited, a subsidiary of Executive Outcomes (EO), a business that supplied mercenaries to governments across Africa. The agreement, negotiated under the Mines and Minerals Act of 1994, was scheduled to last 25 years. Under it Sierra Leone’s military government gave the concession to operate the Koidu diamond mine to the firm in payment for helping to suppress the Revolutionary United Front rebels in the area during the country’s civil war. They had been using the diamonds to buy weapons and ammunition from Guinea, Liberia, and the Sierra Leone army. The government of Sierra Leone retained a 60% ownership stake in the Koidu mine.

The Sierra Leone Civil War ended in 2002. Records leaked from the Panamanian law firm Mossack Fonseca show that the family foundation of Beny Steinmetz family paid $1.2 million for half of the mining license issued by the national government for the Koidu mine. In 2003 the government transferred rights, duties, and responsibilities from Branch Energy to Koidu Holdings, a company owned by Octea of the BSGR Resources group, for $28 million.
.

2007 and 2012 protests 
 
The 2007 Koidutown-Sefadu protest was an action by 400 protesters in Koidu-Sefadu which was aimed at the local diamond mine which the residents claimed had lowered local living conditions and environmental conditions in the area. The result of the protest was a clampdown by Sierra Leonean police, who shot two protesters. Two more protesters were shot in 2012, one of them a 12-year-old boy.

Government 
Koidu town is one of Sierra Leone's six municipalities and is governed by a directly elected city council, headed by a mayor, in whom executive authority is vested. The mayor is responsible for the general management of the city. The mayor is elected directly by the residents of Koidutown every four years in a municipal elections. The current mayor of Koidu Town is Saa Emerson Lamina of the ruling All Peoples Congress party APC. He was suspended by the national government in 2016, following the release of the Panama Papers and publication of an article quoting him complaining about the diamond mine's operation and failure to pay taxes. The City Council then elected Aiah Bartholomew Baima Komba Acting Mayor of Koidu.

Under Lamina the city had also filed suit in 2015 against Koidu’s parent company Octea Limited, claiming that the company owed $684,000 in unpaid property taxes. In April 2016 Justice Bintu Alhadi of the High Court of Sierra Leone ruled that Octea and Koidu Limited were separate entities and that Octea technically did not own the mine, so had no duty to pay its property tax.

Lamina says the suspension was intended to silence him and that he continues to act as mayor because he believes the national government has no authority to remove him from office A 32-page Ministry of Finance and Economic Development audit blamed the finance and procurement officers of the Council for the relatively minor issues, according to Politico.

Ethnicity 
Koidu town is one of the most ethnically diverse cities in Sierra Leone. Even though the city is home of the Kono people, members of all the country's other ethnic groups and most of the foreign diamond workers in the Kono District reside in the city.

Health 
American aid workers helped rebuild the Koidu Government hospital, which has improved the previously alarming health situation in the town.  Various other aid organizations, including the UN Refugee Agency, UNHCR and its partners, have helped drill wells, re-build clinics and schools and regenerate livelihoods in the area, as part of a programme to support the reintegration of Sierra Leoneans who returned after living for several years as refugees in neighbouring countries.

Cultural

Media 

The local radio station in Koidu Town is the Eastern Radio 96.5. The Sierra Leone Broadcasting Corporation (SLBC) TV, and radio are on the air in the city. The BBC World Service, CNN International, and several other international stations are also on the air in the city on satellite.

Sport 
Sierra Leone National Premier League club, the Diamond Stars is based in Koidu. The club represents the Kono District.

Like the rest of Sierra Leone, football (soccer) is by far the most popular sport in Koidu Town. The Sierra Leonean professional football club known as the Diamond Stars of Kono, which is based in Koidu Town, represents the city and the entire Kono District in the Sierra Leone National Premier League. The Diamond Stars Football Club  is overwhelmingly popular in Kono District and is one of the biggest football clubs in Sierra Leone. The Diamond Stars are the champions of the 2012 Sierra Leone National Premier League season, and the first club outside Freetown to ever won the Premier League.

Education

Notable Secondary Schools in Koidutown 
Koidu Secondary School - Founded: 1938
Kono Model Academy - Founded: 1950
Koidu Girls Secondary School - Founded: 1952
Ansarul Islamic Boys Secondary School - Founded: 1974
Ansarul Islamic Girls Secondary School - Founded: 1974
Islamic Secondary School Koidu - Founded: 1979
Ak-hom Secondary School - Founded: 2001

Notable people from Koidu town 
Mohamed Juldeh Jalloh, current Vice President of Sierra Leone 
Fatima Bio, First Lady of Sierra Leone 
 Saa Emerson Lamina, former Mayor of Koidu City
 Samuel Sam-Sumana, Former Vice President of Sierra Leone
Hon. Paramount Chief Sahr Fengai Korgbende Kaimachiande |||, former Paramount Chief Member of Parliament  and former Paramount Chief of Gbense Chiefdom 
 Samuel Harrison Fanday, Journalist of Voice Of Kono Radio 98.0fm 
 Kaifala Marah, former Finance Minister of Sierra Leone
 Alimu Koula Bah, Former Secretary General of Sierra Leone Football Association
 Diana Konomanyi, Former Sierra Leone minister of Lands
 Sam Bockarie, former RUF rebel leader
 Aiah Abu Koroma, Former Leader of Democratic Centre Party (DCP)
 Mary Musa, First Female Mayor of Koidu City
 Khady Black, Sierra Leonean Reggae Musician
 Mamadi O Jalloh, Community Activist & Organizer, New York City, United States
 Francis Koroma, Footballer
 K-Man, Sierra Leonean Musician
 Karamoh Kabba, Politician
 Komba Yomba, Footballer
 Sidique Mansaray, Footballer
 Alimamy Jalloh, Footballer
 Ibrahim Bah, Footballer
 Mohamed Saccoh, Rapper
 Yayah Jalloh, footballer
Musa John Pujeh (Satellite Man), Reggae dancehall singer
Sahr Emmanuel Yambasu, Chief Administrator Pujun District Council 
Samuel Harrison Fanday, Journalist of Voice Of Kono Radio 98.0FM

References 

 
Populated places in Sierra Leone
Eastern Province, Sierra Leone